John Nourse (baptised 8 July 1705, in Oxford – 24 April 1780, in London) was an English bookseller and book publisher noted for his publication of scientific books. He had dealings with a number of notable people including Benjamin Franklin.

Education
He was the son of a surgeon and was educated at John Roysse's Free School, in Abingdon (now Abingdon School). He later became a Steward of the OA Club in 1747.

Career
Nourse became apprenticed to William Mears as a bookseller. His brother, the surgeon Charles Nourse took over the business when he died. His premises were at the Old King's Arms opposite Catherine Street on the Strand, London.

He was licensed to publish the first Nautical Almanac and Astronomical Ephemeris, dated 1766, but actually appearing in 1767, as evinced by correspondence between Nevil Maskelyne and Nourse.

He died in Kensington and was buried at the University Church of St Mary the Virgin, Oxford on 2 May 1780. His will is in The National Archives, Kew.

See also
 List of Old Abingdonians

References

Further reading
 John Feather, "John Nourse and his Authors", Studies in Bibliography (published by: Bibliographical Society of the University of Virginia), Vol. 34 (1981), pp. 205–226.
 Susan Snell, People on the Strand: John Nourse and Francis Wingrave, Booksellers, strandlines.com.

English booksellers
English book publishers (people)
1780 deaths
1705 births